Cefni Hospital is a health facility in Llangefni, Anglesey, Wales. It is managed by the Betsi Cadwaladr University Health Board.

History
The original hospital on the site was built in the early 20th century. The site was redeveloped to create a substantially enlarged facility, intended to facilitate the closure of the aging Druid Isolation Hospital, in 1993. The enlarged facility became a facility for older people with memory difficulties in 2009.

References

Hospitals in Anglesey
Hospitals established in 1993
1993 establishments in Wales
Hospital buildings completed in 1993
NHS hospitals in Wales
Betsi Cadwaladr University Health Board